United States v. Rehlander was a 2011 case heard in the United States Court of Appeals for the First Circuit. It struck down a Maine law providing that temporary commitment triggered automatic revocation of a patient's firearms license.

The court held that the firearms ban could only apply to individuals who had received due process through a judicial hearing.

References

Lawsuits